Gusto is the seventh album by the Huntington Beach, California pop punk band Guttermouth, released in 2002 by Epitaph Records.  It found the band taking their style of fast, abrasive punk rock in new directions, experimenting with elements of pop and other styles.  Their usual tongue-in-cheek humor and sarcastic lyrics remain intact, but the album's overall sound is quite different from any of their others.  This was due partly to a lineup change: founding member and frequent songwriter James Nunn had left the group the previous year, leaving guitarists Scott Sheldon and Eric Davis to fill in on bass, along with studio bassist Hedge.  The album received generally poor reviews from both critics and longtime fans, and would later be regarded by the band as somewhat of a failed experiment.

Track listing 
All songs written by Guttermouth
 "Camp Fire Girl #62" 2:55
 "Scholarship in Punk" 2:15
 "Gusto" 2:13
 "Vacation" 2:52
 "Contagious" 2:51
 "Pee in the Shower" 2:29
 "Walk of Shame" 2:34
 "My Town" 2:36
 "Contribution" 2:17
 "Foot-Long" 1:56
 "Looking Out for #1" 1:48
 "Twins" 2:09
 "My Girlfriend" 2:35
 "Lemon Water" 3:19

Performers 
 Mark Adkins - Vocals
 Scott Sheldon - guitar, bass guitar, guiro, backing vocals
 Eric "Derek" Davis - guitar, bass guitar, keyboards, vocals
 Hedge - bass (tracks 1, 2, 5, 6 & 11)
 William Tyler "Ty" Smith - drums
 Eric Mayron - vocals on "Lemon Water"
 Emily "Agent M" Whitehurst (Tsunami Bomb) - backing vocals on "My Town" and "Twins"

Album information
Record label: Epitaph Records
Recorded at Paramount Studios and Can Am Studios
Mixed at Paramount Studios by Jim Goodwin
Mastered by Gene Grimaldi at Oasis Mastering
Produced by Scott Sheldon, Eric Davis, Jim Goodwin, and Mark Adkins
All songs by Guttermouth
Art by Mark Adkins
Layout by C. Martin

References

Guttermouth albums
2002 albums
Epitaph Records albums